The Coart family is a Belgian noble family from the Prince-Bishopric of Liège whose proven ancestry dates to 1661.

Notable members 

 Justin Coart, alderman of Tongres from 1861 to 1878, member of the Provincial Council of Limburg, and Knight of the Order of Leopold.
Arsène-Henri-Justin Coart (1829-1915), President Emeritus of the Tongres Court and an Officer of the Order of Leopold.
Emile-Jean-Mathias-Lambert Coart (1860-1943), Knight of the Order of Leopold, magistrate, lawyer and the President of the Tongres Bar.
Paul J. Coart (1892-1979), écuyer, doctor of Law, Grand Officer of the Order of the Crown and of the Order of Leopold II, Commander of the Order of Leopold.

Authority 

Content in this edit is translated from the existing French Wikipedia article at :fr:Famille Coart; see its history for attribution.

Notes and references

Further reading 

 Cl-R Paternostre de la Mairieu, TABLETTES DU HAINAUT Tome II La Descendance des DE BAY, 1956 p. 83–89 et p. 111 

 Blaise d'Ostende-à-Arlon, Noblesse belge d'apparence, Les cahiers nobles, 1968. (voir : Coart, Frésart)

 Philippe de Bounam de Ryckholt et Georges de Hemptinne, Lettres de Noblesse octroyées par Sa Majesté Baudouin, Roi des Belges, 1951-1991 p. 65

 Paul Janssens & Luc Duerloo. Armorial de la noblesse belge du xve au xxe siècle. Bruxelles, Crédit communal, 1992. Tome A-E, p. 535. Planche no 683, armoiries no 3394. 

 Oscar Coomans de Brachène, État présent de la noblesse belge - Première partie Clo/Crom - Annuaire de 2005 

 État présent de la noblesse belge. Annuaire de 2019, p. 241-242.

Allied families 
  de Muyser Lantwyck family

See also 

 Godfried Coart
 List of noble families in Belgium

Belgian noble families